The Plymouth Duster is a 2-door coupé sold from 1969 to 1976.

Plymouth Duster may also refer to:
 An optional trim package for the Plymouth Volaré (1979-1980)
 An optional trim package for the Plymouth Turismo (1985-1987)
 An optional trim package for the Plymouth Sundance (1992-1994)